The Pakistan national rugby league team was founded in 2008 to represent Pakistan in rugby league football after receiving support from the British Asian Rugby Association. In 2009 the team was granted official observer status by the Rugby League International Federation.

Pakistan played their first match as a national team against the BARLA Lions in Dubai, United Arab Emirates. They went down 62-0.

References

External links
http://www.rugbyleagueplanet.com/RLP/Nations/Pakistan.htm